Tête du Rouget is a mountain in the French Alps, located in the Massif des Écrins.

Mountains of Isère
Mountains of the Alps
Alpine three-thousanders